Bunodophoron pinnatum is a species of lichen in the family Sphaerophoraceae. Found in the Northern Province of Papua New Guinea, it was described as new to science in 2011 by lichenologist Mats Wedin.

References

Lecanorales
Lichen species
Lichens described in 2011
Lichens of New Guinea